Long Distance Calling is a post-rock band from Münster, Germany, formed in 2006. The majority of their tracks are extended instrumentals.

History 
In 2008, Long Distance Calling played at the Rock am Ring and Roadburn festivals, and toured Germany in 2009. In 2010, Long Distance Calling and Finnish death/doom band Swallow the Sun supported Katatonia during the New Night Over Europe tour. They supported Protest the Hero on their 2012 European tour. Off the back of the release of Boundless the band performed live at a number of European summer festivals, including Wacken Open Air in 2018.

As of 2022, Long Distance Calling have released eight full-length albums, including: Satellite Bay (2007), Avoid the Light (2009), Long Distance Calling (2011), The Flood Inside (2013), Nighthawk (2014), Boundless (2018), How Do We Want to Live? (2020),  and Eraser (2022). The band have also released two demos and/or split EPs: DMNSTRTN (2006) and 090208 (2008).

The band has collaborated with guest vocalists including Peter Dolving from The Haunted ("Built Without Hands" from Satellite Bay), John Bush from Armored Saint (ex-Anthrax) ("Middleville" from Long Distance Calling) and Jonas Renkse from Swedish metal band Katatonia ("The Nearing Grave" from Avoid the Light).

Members

Current members 
 David Jordan – guitar
 Janosch Rathmer – drums
 Florian Füntmann – guitar
 Jan Hoffmann – bass

Past members
 Petter Carlsen – vocals
 Martin Fischer – vocals and sounds

Discography

Studio albums 
 2007: Satellite Bay (Viva Hate/Cargo Records)
 2009: Avoid the Light (Superball Music/SPV)
 2011: Long Distance Calling (Superball Music/SPV)
 2013: The Flood Inside (Superball Music/SPV)
 2016: Trips (InsideOut)
 2018: Boundless (InsideOut)
 2020: How Do We Want to Live? (InsideOut)
 2022: Eraser (earMUSIC)

Demos and split EPs 

 2006: DMNSTRTN (Limited demo album)
 2008: 090208 (Viva Hate/Cargo Records, Split EP with Leech)
 2014: Nighthawk (Avoid the Light Records)
 2021: Ghost (Avoid the Light Records)

Singles and music videos
"Jungfernflug" (2008)
"Into the Black Wide Open" (2012)
"Tell The End" (2013)
"Getaway" (2016)
"Trauma" (2016)
"Out There" (2017)
"Ascending" (2018)
"Hazards" (2020)
"Voices" (2020)
"Immunity" (2020)
"Kamilah" (2022)

References

External links

 
 Long Distance Calling at progarchives.com
 
 
 Long Distance Calling at Last.fm
 Long Distance Calling at Sputnikmusic
 interview with Jan Hoffmann
 Long Distance Calling at Myspace
 Long Distance Calling official YouTube channel

German post-rock groups
Musical groups established in 2006
Inside Out Music artists
Superball Music artists
SPV GmbH artists
Sony Music Publishing artists
Progressive rock groups